Cecil Curran was an Irish Lawn bowls international who competed in the 1934 British Empire Games.

Bowls career
At the 1934 British Empire Games he won the silver medal in the rinks (fours) event with Charlie Clawson, George Watson and Percy Watson.

He bowled for the Shaftesbury Bowls Club in Belfast  and was twice National pairs champion with Charlie Clawson in 1932 and 1939.

References

Male lawn bowls players from Northern Ireland
Bowls players at the 1934 British Empire Games
Commonwealth Games silver medallists for Northern Ireland
Commonwealth Games medallists in lawn bowls
Medallists at the 1934 British Empire Games